Patrick Anderson of Walston was a 17th-century minister and Covenanter.

Early life
He graduated with an M.A. from St. Andrews 1648. He came to Walston between 1 May and 1 November 1655.

Legal troubles

He was subsequently deprived of his post by Act of Parliament 11 June, and of Privy Council 1 October 1662. He was granted indulgence in Dreghorn or at Kilbirnie prior to 22 October 1674.

He was ejected for non-conformity in 1663. In September 1672, he was ordered by the council, under the Act of Indulgence, to repair to the parish of Kilbirnie, and there to remain confined, with permission to preach and to exercise the other parts of his ministerial function, — which order he did not obey. In 1673, he was called before the council, and ordered to his confinement. He stayed in Edinburgh at Potterrow for some years but was called before the Privy Council, on 3 April 1678, on a charge of having held conventicles at Boghall, Biggar, and in his house during the years 1674–1648, and of corresponding with John Welsh, Gabriel Semple, and other intercommuned persons such as Williamson and Johnston. He appeared and denied the charge. He was pronounced guilty and sentenced to imprisonment on the Bass, unless he found caution to the amount of 2000 merks, and agreed to remove from Edinburgh and not come within five and a half miles of the city, or converse with any persons but the members of his own family. He was sent to the Bass Rock on the Firth of Forth in Haddingtonshire in April 1678. He found the necessary security, and retired to Dalkeith, where he set up a meeting-house. He was released in July 1679.
At the request of the Duchess of Buccleuch and Monmouth he was forbidden, and threatened with imprisonment. He returned to Walston before 6 July 1689. Anderson survived the Revolution, and on the ejection of Mr. John Kinked, an Episcopalian incumbent, he became minister of his old parish of Walston, where he laboured with great acceptance until he died. He was restored in 1689. He returned previous to 6 July 1689. He was restored by Act of Parliament 25 April 1690, and died 22 July following, aged about 63.

Family
He married Margaret Threipland, who was joined with him in a sasine, 29 November 1659, and in another with their children, 24 June 1663, of the corn mill of Biggar and pertinents. His son James, M.A., W.S., Postmaster-General for Scotland, genealogist and antiquary, author of Selectus Diplomatum Numismatum Scotice Thesaurus, and of Collections relating to the History of Mary, Queen of Scots, born 5 August 1662, died 3 April 1728.

 His daughter Mary married (cont. 23rd, 25th, and 29 April 1678: Perth Sas., vii., 193) David Pitcairn of Dreghorn, and was grandmother of Principal Robertson.

His son James Anderson was a Writer to the Signet and was appointed Postmaster General for Scotland and became a well-known Scottish antiquary and historian.

Bibliography
Kirkton's and Wodrow's Histories
New Statistical Account of Scotland, Vol vi 
New Gen. Reg. Sasines, iii., iv. 
Inq. Ret. Gen., 7188
Murray's Biog. Ann. 
Chalmers's Life of Ruddiman 
Chambers's Biographical Dictionary., i.
The moderators of the Church of Scotland from 1690 to 1740

References

Covenanters
Scottish prisoners and detainees
Covenanting Prisoners of the Bass Rock
17th-century Ministers of the Church of Scotland